South Bangka Regency is a regency (kabupaten) of Bangka Belitung Islands Province, Indonesia, with the town of Toboali as its regency seat. It also includes several small islands off the coast of Bangka in the Gaspar Strait, such as Lepar and Pongok. The regency covers an area of 3,607.08 km2 and had a population of 172,476 at the 2010 Census and 198,189 at the 2020 Census.

Administrative Districts

At the time of the 2010 Census, the Regency was divided into seven districts (kecamatan), but in 2013 an eighth district was added by the splitting of the Lepar Pongok District into separate districts based on Lepar Island and Pongok Island. the districts are tabulated below with their areas and their populations at the 2010 Census and 2020 Census. The table also includes the numbers of administrative villages (rural desa and urban kelurahan) in each district, and its postal code.

Notes: (a) includes 3 offshore islands. (b) includes 6 offshore islands. (c) includes 22 offshore islands. (d) Lepar Pongok and Kepulauan Pongok Districts between them include 28 offshore islands. (e) the population of Kepulauan Pongok District for 2010 is included with the figure for Lepar Pongok District, from which it was cut out in 2013. Note that the residual Lepar Pongok District has not altered its name, even though it no longer contains Pongok Island.

References

External links

  

Regencies of Bangka Belitung Islands